Wuraso is a community near Kumawu in the Ashanti Region of Ghana.

Institution 

 Wuraso Police Station

References 

Ashanti Region
Communities in Ghana